The Wooden Church is a church in Derşida, Romania, built in 1771.

See also
 Wooden Church, Zalnoc

References

External links
 Derşida, Biserica de lemn

Historic monuments in Sălaj County
Wooden churches in Sălaj County
Churches completed in 1771